The Legislative Council of Lower Canada was the upper house of the bicameral structure of provincial government in Lower Canada until 1838. The upper house consisted of appointed councillors who voted on bills passed up by the Legislative Assembly of Lower Canada. The legislative council was created by the Constitutional Act. Many of the members first called in the Council in 1792 had served as councillors in the Council for the Affairs of the Province of Quebec.

The council came to be dominated by the Château Clique, members of the province's most powerful families who were generally interested in preserving the status quo. Both the upper and lower houses were dissolved on March 27, 1838 following the Lower Canada Rebellion and Lower Canada was administered by an appointed Special Council.

Following the Act of Union in 1840, the Legislative Council of the Province of Canada was created in 1841.

Legislative buildings
 Old Parliament Building (Quebec)

List of Members of the Legislative Council

Speakers

During much of the existence of the Legislative Council, the Chief Justice served as Speaker and others appointed to the role in absence of the Chief Justice.

 William Smith 1791-1793
 William Osgoode 1794-1797
 Thomas Dunn 1797-1801
 James Monk 1802
 John Elmsley 1803-1804
 Thomas Dunn 1805
 François Baby 1806
 Henry Allcock 1807-1808
 Thomas Dunn 1808
 Jonathan Sewell 1809-1810
 Thomas Dunn 1811-?
 James Monk 1815-1816
 Jonathan Sewell 1817
 John Hale 1818
 Jonathan Sewell 1819-1826
 James Kerr 1827-1828
 Jonathan Sewell 1829-1830
 John Hale 1831
 Sir John Caldwell 1831-?
 Jonathan Sewell 1833-1838

After the Rebellion, the Speaker was a member of the Special Council of Lower Canada:

 James Cuthbert, Jr. 1838
 Sir James Stuart, 1st Baronet 1839-1841

See also
Executive Council of Lower Canada
Constitutional history of Canada
Legislative Council of Quebec

Notes
Unless otherwise noted, the member died in office.

External links
 Journals of the Legislative Council of the province of Lower Canada (1802–1837) (Canadiana.org)
 Aux fenêtres du Parlement de Québec : histoire, traditions, coutumes, usages, procédures, souvenirs, anecdotes, commissions et autres organismes, D. Potvin (1942)
  Assemblée nationale du Québec (French)

Lower Canada
Defunct upper houses in Canada

1792 establishments in Lower Canada